Irena Jordanova (born 8 September 1980) is a Macedonian writer. She graduated from the Department of World and Comparative Literature at Ss. Cyril and Methodius University of Skopje.

Career
Jordanova published her first story titled "Streets" in a joint student publication named Calculation at WCL. She also published short stories in various Macedonian literary magazines. Her first novel, In Between, was published in 2008 and was a finalist for the prestigious national Novel of the Year Award  by the daily newspaper Utrinski vesnik. With her creative prose, she participated in numerous events, readings and conferences and she took part of the International Biennial of Young Artists from Europe in 2009. That same year, she wrote her short story Abandoned Mother for the Biennial reading. In 2010, she published her second novel, The Catalyst 33.

The critics find her writing style as a fiction with bold self-irony. It is a fiction that shows, at the same time, a broad literary culture and a full range of storytelling techniques. Using different kind of "shifts" she plays with meanings and allusions. The permanent dialogue between "I and the Other" she is moving everything that is "fixed" in "mobile" creating a "new ethic" within the traditional literary norms. In her works there is a predominance of bizarre as aesthetic and ethical element creating an original storytelling line. Some of the readers find that despite the positive theme of love & affection, in part of her works there are scenes of cruelty and violence.  In 2014 her short story Millisekunden Liebe eng: Milliseconds of Love was published in German and English language

The Catalyst 33 was published in English in 2012 

Her third novel "Willing floating boat" was published in 2018.

Books
 In Between (2008, Skopje: Ili Ili Publishing)
 The Catalyst 33 (2010, Skopje: Ili Ili Publishing)
 Willing floating boat (2018, Skopje: Ili Ili Publishing)

References

1980 births
Living people
Macedonian women writers